"All About You" ("A Poem Titled You") is a song recorded by South Korean singer Taeyeon for the soundtrack of the 2019 drama series Hotel del Luna. It was released as a digital single on July 21, 2019, by YAMYAM Entertainment, under license by Dreamus.

The single topped South Korea's Gaon Digital Chart for two consecutive weeks, and reached number two on the Korea K-Pop Hot 100 chart. It was nominated for Best  at the 12th Korea Drama Awards, and won OST Award at the 2020 Seoul Music Awards.

Background 
On July 9, 2019, YAMYAM Entertainment confirmed that Taeyeon would be among the singers to record the soundtrack for the drama series Hotel Del Luna. This marked the first time Taeyeon released a soundtrack recording after three years, following "All with You" for Moon Lovers: Scarlet Heart Ryeo (2016). The song, titled "" (literally "A Poem Titled You") in Korean and "All About You" in English, was produced by Song Dong-woon, who had previously produced the soundtracks for hit dramas such as Descendants of the Sun and Goblin: The Lonely and Great God. "All About You" was released on July 21, 2019, as a digital single by YAMYAM Entertainment, under license by Dreamus.

Reception 
"All About You" debuted atop the Gaon Digital Chart dated July 21–27, 2019. It remained on the top spot for one further week and ranked second on the Gaon Monthly Digital Chart for August 2019. Overall, "All About You" spent nine weeks in the top ten. It placed at number 31 on the year-end chart, ranking 55th in terms of sales and 32nd in terms of streaming.

Lee Seung-mi of The Chosun Ilbo commented that the "delicate" piano melody and Taeyeon's "refined" vocals created a mysterious charm that complemented the themes of the drama. Hwang Hye-jin from South Korean news portal Newsen commented that the commercial success of "All About You" brought back the "OST fever" that last happened in 2017 with the soundtrack of Goblin, particularly Ailee's "I Will Go to You Like the First Snow". Hwang also praised Taeyeon's emotional voice and the "exquisite" piano that gave the song a grieving atmosphere.

Track listing
Digital download and streaming
"All About You" — 3:29
"All About You" (Instrumental) – 3:29

Credits
Credits adapted from Melon.

Produced by Song Dong-woon
Lyrics by Ji-hoon and Park Se-joon
Music by minGtion
Arranged by minGtion 

Vocal directed by Kim Yeon-seo
Recorded by Goo Jong-pil at SM Yellow Tail Studio
Mixed by Kim Hyun-gon at doobdoob Studio
Executive producer: YAMYAM Entertainment

Charts

Weekly charts

Year-end charts

Certifications and sales

! colspan="3" | Streaming
|-

Awards and nominations

See also 
 List of Gaon Digital Chart number ones of 2019
 List of certified songs in South Korea

References

2019 singles
SM Entertainment singles
Korean-language songs
Taeyeon songs
2019 songs
Gaon Digital Chart number-one singles
South Korean television drama theme songs